The grey shrikethrush or grey shrike-thrush (Colluricincla harmonica), formerly commonly known as grey thrush, is a songbird of Australasia. It is moderately common to common in most parts of Australia, but absent from the driest of the inland deserts. It is also found in New Guinea.

Taxonomy and systematics
The grey shrikethrush was originally described in the genus Turdus. Alternate names include the brown shrike-thrush, buff-bellied shrike-thrush, grey shrike-flycatcher, northern shrike-thrush and south-western shrike-thrush.

Subspecies
Five subspecies are recognized:
 C. h. brunnea - Gould, 1841: Originally described as a separate species. Found in northern Australia and Melville Island
 C. h. superciliosa - Masters, 1876: Originally described as a separate species. Found in eastern New Guinea, islands in the Torres Strait and north-eastern Australia
 C. h. harmonica - (Latham, 1801): Found in eastern Australia
 C. h. strigata - Swainson, 1838: Originally described as a separate species. Found in Tasmania and the islands in the Bass Strait (Australia)
 Western shrikethrush (C. h. rufiventris) - Gould, 1841: Originally described as a separate species. Found in western, southern and central Australia

Description

Status
The grey shrikethrush is evaluated as least concern on the IUCN Red List of Threatened Species.

Gallery

References

External links 
 BirdLife Species Factsheet

grey shrikethrush
Birds of Australia
Birds of New Guinea
grey shrikethrush
Articles containing video clips